Following the Peterloo Massacre on 16 August 1819, the government of the United Kingdom acted to prevent any future disturbances by the introduction of new legislation, the so-called Six Acts aimed at suppressing any meetings for the purpose of radical reform. Élie Halévy considered them a panic-stricken extension of "the counter-revolutionary terror ... under the direct patronage of Lord Sidmouth and his colleagues"; some later historians have treated them as relatively mild gestures towards law and order, only tentatively enforced.

The setting, and the passing of the acts
Following the Yeomanry killing of unarmed men and women in St Peter's Field (Peterloo), a wave of protest meetings swept the North of England, spilling over into the Midlands and the Lowlands, and involving in all some seventeen counties. Local magistrates appealed in the face of the protests for central support; and in response the Parliament of the United Kingdom was reconvened on 23 November and the new acts were introduced by the Home Secretary, Henry Addington. By 30 December the legislation was passed, despite the opposition of the Whigs to both their principles and many of their details.

The acts were aimed at gagging radical newspapers, preventing large meetings, and reducing what the government saw as the possibility of armed insurrection. During the Commons debates, each of the parties appealed to the example of the French Revolution to make their case. The Tories pointed to the weakness of the French forces of law and order; the Whigs, conversely, to the need for the safety valve of free speech and a free press.

Strengthened by their success at the 1818 elections, the Whigs were able to make three significant amendments to the bills as originally proposed: public meetings were to be allowed behind closed doors, and the ban on outside meetings was to be limited in time; transportation of Press offenders was made more difficult; and the curtailment of legal delays was extended to include prosecution as well as defendant. Nevertheless, the Six Acts were eventually passed by prime minister Lord Liverpool and his colleagues, as part of their repressive approach focused on preventing a British revolution.

Details of the acts

The six acts were:

The Training Prevention Act, now known as the Unlawful Drilling Act 1819 (60 Geo. III & 1 Geo. IV c. 1), made any person attending a meeting for the purpose of receiving training or drill in weapons liable to arrest and transportation. More simply stated, military training of any sort was to be conducted only by municipal bodies and above.
The Seizure of Arms Act (60 Geo. III & 1 Geo. IV c. 2) gave local magistrates the powers, within the disturbed counties, to search any private property for weapons and seize them and arrest the owners.
The Misdemeanours Act (60 Geo. III & 1 Geo. IV c. 4) attempted to increase the speed of the administration of justice by reducing the opportunities for bail and allowing for speedier court processing.
The Seditious Meetings Act (60 Geo. III & 1 Geo. IV c. 6) required the permission of a sheriff or magistrate in order to convene any public meeting of more than 50 people if the subject of that meeting was concerned with "church or state" matters. Additional people could not attend such meetings unless they were inhabitants of the parish.
The Blasphemous and Seditious Libels Act (or Criminal Libel Act) (60 Geo. III & 1 Geo. IV c. 8), toughened the existing laws to provide for more punitive sentences for the authors of such writings. The maximum sentence was increased to fourteen years' transportation.
The Newspaper and Stamp Duties Act (60 Geo. III & 1 Geo. IV c. 9) extended and increased taxes to cover those publications which had escaped duty by publishing opinion and not news. Publishers were also required to post a bond for their behaviour.

Repeal of the acts, and their influence
Different time-scales applied to the different acts.

The prohibition of drilling was maintained into the twentieth century, and only repealed in 2008.  
By contrast, the seizure of arms was set up to elapse after 27 months; while the Seditious Meetings Prevention Act had a five-year time limit built in, and was repealed in 1824.  
G. M. Trevelyan considered that "The most lasting injury to the community was done by the Act imposing a four-penny stamp on all periodical publications"—a charge reduced (to a penny) in 1836, before such taxes on knowledge finally vanished mid-century.

The Six Acts went down in folk history, alongside Peterloo, as symbols of the repressive nature of the Pittite regime.

See also
Cato Street Conspiracy
Coercion Act
Earl of Eldon
Police state
Radicalism (historical)

References

Footnotes

Bibliography

Further reading 
 Hollis, Patricia, Class and conflict in nineteenth-century England, 1815-1850, Birth of modern Britain series, International Library of Sociology and Social Reconstruction, Routledge, 1973, 

Political repression in the United Kingdom
United Kingdom Acts of Parliament 1819